The following is an alphabetical list of members of the United States House of Representatives from the state of Nevada.  For chronological tables of members of both houses of the United States Congress from the state (through the present day), see United States congressional delegations from Nevada.  The list of names should be complete (as of January 3, 2015), but other data may be incomplete. It includes members who have represented both the state and the territory, both past and present.

Current members

List of members and delegates

Key

See also

List of United States senators from Nevada
United States congressional delegations from Nevada
Nevada's congressional districts

References 

United States representatives
 
United States representatives
Nevada